The 2018 Bury Metropolitan Borough Council election took place on 3 May 2018 to elect members of Bury Metropolitan Borough Council in England. This was on the same day as other local elections.

Result

Wards

Besses

Church

East

Elton

Holyrood

Moorside

North Manor

Pilkington Park

Radcliffe East

Radcliffe North

Radcliffe West

Ramsbottom

Redvales

Sedgley

St Mary's

Tottington

Unsworth

References

2018 English local elections
2018
2010s in Greater Manchester